Andre Begemann and Jan-Lennard Struff were the defending champions but chose not to defend their title.

Jonathan Erlich and Divij Sharan won the title after defeating Hans Podlipnik-Castillo and Andrei Vasilevski 7–6(7–1), 6–2 in the final.

Seeds

Draw

References
 Main Draw

Canberra Challenger - Doubles